Lu Chunli is a Chinese female Paralympic sitting volleyball player. She is part of the China women's national sitting volleyball team.

She competed at the 2008 Summer Paralympics winning the gold medal.

See also 
 China at the 2008 Summer Paralympics

References 

Living people
Volleyball players at the 2008 Summer Paralympics
Paralympic competitors for China
Chinese women's volleyball players
Year of birth missing (living people)
Medalists at the 2008 Summer Paralympics
Paralympic medalists in volleyball
Paralympic gold medalists for China
21st-century Chinese women